Manish Khera is an Indian banker and businessman. He worked at ICICI Bank (1993–2005), after which he founded FINO Paytech (later FINO Payments Bank) in 2006.[1]

Later, he invested in YTS Solutions,[2] a banking company  focused on people who do not have their own bank account in India. In 2014, he applied to the Reserve Bank of India (RBI) for a small finance bank license.  In 2015, he became the CEO of Airtel Money Services Limited, which later became Airtel Payments Bank.

Khera was selected as the Young Global Leader of 2011 by the World Economic Forum.

Education

Khera is an electrical engineer from Delhi College of Engineering (then a constituent college of the University of Delhi, now the Delhi Technological University), having a Master's Degree in Business Administration (Finance) from the Faculty of Management Studies, The University of Delhi, along with an M.Phil. in Environment and Development from the University of Cambridge in the U.K. He is also a Department for International Development scholar. The Department for International Development (DFID), established in the United Kingdom, is responsible for administering overseas aid, aiming to promote sustainable development while trying to eradicate world poverty.

Career

Years with ICICI Bank (1993–2006) 
In 2004, after gaining experience in corporate and structured lending, and transaction banking and banking technology, Manish set up the Alternate Channels Group (ACG) within ICICI Bank to serve the need and opportunity of offering banking services to the banking deprived in India. ACG's objective was to find unconventional and alternate channels to provide banking services to the unserved segment.

During this period, he also worked with the Reserve Bank of India (RBI) to get the Business Correspondent guidelines issued working with the Khan Committee, which gave recommendations for this pioneering change of financial inclusion initiative in India.[5]

At the Alternate Channels Group, Manish designed a system that leveraged biometric paperless technology and no physical infrastructure to reach the unserved and underbanked population in India. That laid the foundation for Financial Information Network and Operations Ltd. (FINO), which was later renamed FINO Paytech.

Years with FINO Paytech Limited (2005–2013) 
FINO Paytech Ltd. was founded in 2006 by Manish Khera. He was Chief Executive Officer and Managing Director of the company.

In 2006, Manish combined low-cost innovation aligned with customer ability and skill sets, the lack of infrastructure in India and the radical move by RBI to permit Business Correspondents to solicit and service customers, to successfully deliver banking services for the micro-segment (below poverty line population) along with business profitability. This endeavor has been one of the most appreciated success stories in the micro segment category. His thought and innovative approach to the business has encouraged other players in the field to come up and create value chains for their customers of the same segment. Under his leadership, FINO grew to service over 70 million customers across more than 50,000 Business Correspondent points making it the largest globally. FINO has now become FINO Payments Bank.

Years with YTS – Yatra Tatra Sarvatra (2014–present) 
After the success of FINO Paytech Ltd., Manish invested in Yatra Tatra Sarvatra (YTS) in 2014. The USP of YTS was its ubiquitous services. YTS operated on a mobile banking platform that assisted migrant customers in remitting money instantaneously across the country at a low cost and in carrying out their banking transactions using a low cost phone. This USP was the inspiration for the name. In Sanskrit Yatra Tatra Sarvatra translates to Here There Everywhere. YTS had laid good foundation working with the migrant population who relocated from rural to urban India. Looking at the good solution set developed by YTS and the rapid business scale, Airtel acquired the remittance and payments business of YTS and has not been operational since 2015. Manish became the CEO of Airtel Money Services Limited and in a period of 10 months, he tripled the business volume and revenue that had been stagnant for the previous two years. He laid the foundation of and converted Airtel Money into Airtel Payments Bank.

Manish Khera was an applicant of the Small Finance Bank under RBI guidelines along with 72 others. Though his application was not successful, he continues his pursuit of becoming a small finance bank.

ArthImpact (founded 2016) 
In December 2016 Manish founded ArthImpact, a digital micro-lending fintech company which would facilitate financial inclusion across socio-economic segments. His intention for ArthImpact is to make money management simpler for customers – be it digital natives or marginal grass root communities. Via ArthImpact, Manish aims to reach out to 600 million people in India who do not have access to mainstream banking. This formed the genesis of the idea and the drive that led to ArthImpact being founded.

As a banking veteran specializing in Micro Finance, Khera understood that micro customers are not always on the lookout for large value loans. They are more interested in a solution that could solve their everyday cash mismatch problems. ArthImpact endeavours to be the solution here with digital banking solutions for micro customers like merchants, housewives and students who may not have access to mainstream banking for micro credits. The credit ranges from INR 2,000 to INR 100,000, and is allotted to customers depending on their repayment capacity.

ArthImpact launched a micro lending product as Happy Loans – an everyday financial adviser to its users. It is designed to make the transaction of lending instant, that including disbursing credit and receiving the credit repayment digitally. The whole process is 100% paperless with zero manual intervention. While it offers end-to-end digital micro lending services to 600mn Indians who do not have access to mainstream banking, at the same time it also helps merchants in building their credit rating by adopting a disciplined repayment pattern.

Awards and recognition

Khera is an advocate of socially relevant businesses that are also financially viable. He has received praise for his role as one of the thought leaders in the financial inclusion and micro-finance space in India.

He has been honored and recognized as "Young Global Leader of 2011" by World Economic Forum.

Manish has also been recognized by E&Y as the "Entrepreneur of the Year 2011" and has been awarded the Forbes India Leadership award 2012 for the "Outstanding Start-Up".

References

Indian bankers
Living people
Year of birth missing (living people)
Delhi Technological University alumni